Walls of Fire is a 1971 American documentary film directed by Herbert Kline and Edmund Penney. Narrated by Ricardo Montalbán, this documentary examines the history of Mexican murals and their artists. Among the works examined are those by José Clemente Orozco, Diego Rivera and David Alfaro Siqueiros. It was nominated for an Academy Award for Best Documentary Feature. The documentary was also won a Golden Globe award for Best Documentary film in 1972.

Cast
 José Clemente Orozco as himself
 Diego Rivera as himself
 David Alfaro Siqueiros as himself

References

External links

1971 films
1971 documentary films
American documentary films
American independent films
Documentary films about visual artists
Mexican muralists
1970s English-language films
Films directed by Herbert Kline
1970s American films